Silverstone University Technical College (or Silverstone UTC) is a university technical college (UTC) that opened at the Silverstone Circuit in Northamptonshire, England in September 2013. The UTC specialises in High Performance Engineering and Business & Technical Events Management for 14- to 19-year-olds.

The University of Northampton and Tresham College are the lead academic sponsors of Silverstone UTC, while Silverstone Circuit is the lead business sponsor.

References

External links
 Silverstone UTC official website

Secondary schools in West Northamptonshire District
University Technical Colleges
Educational institutions established in 2013
2013 establishments in England
University of Northampton